You Were Never Lovelier is a 1942 American musical romantic comedy film directed by William A. Seiter and starring Fred Astaire and Rita Hayworth. The supporting cast also features Adolphe Menjou, Xavier Cugat and Adele Mara. The music was composed by Jerome Kern and the lyrics by Johnny Mercer. The picture was released by Columbia Pictures and includes the elaborate "Shorty George" song and dance sequence.

The film, a Hollywood remake of the 1941 Argentine romantic comedy Los martes, orquídeas (On Tuesdays, Orchids), is set in Buenos Aires.

Plot
Robert "Bob" Davis (Fred Astaire) is a well-known American dancer with a weakness for betting on the horses. After he loses his money gambling in Buenos Aires, he goes looking for a job with Eduardo Acuña, the wealthy owner of a nightclub. Acuña, however, does not wish to see him. Bob's friend, bandleader Xavier Cugat, invites him to perform at the wedding of Acuña's eldest daughter, Julia, Acuña insists his daughters must wed in order of age, from oldest to youngest. Maria (Rita Hayworth) is next in line to get married but refuses to, much to the disappointment of her two younger sisters, Cecy and Lita, who both have boyfriends and want to get married as soon as possible.

During Julia's wedding reception, Bob is attracted to Maria, but his advances are rebuffed by Maria, who refuses to talk to him. While talking with Acuña, Bob remarks that Maria's personality is like "the inside of a refrigerator". Aware of his younger daughters' plight, Acuña works out a plan: sending orchids and anonymous love notes from a secret admirer to Maria to help get her in the mood. One day, when Bob once again tries to see Acuña at his office, Acuña orders the unseen Bob, mistakenly assuming him to be a bellboy, to deliver the latest note and flower. Maria, who by now is in love and eagerly awaiting the next love letter from her secret admirer, sees Bob dropping off the note and flower and assumes that he is her admirer. When Maria sees Bob at her father's office, she asks her father to introduce them and invite Bob to dinner. At the dinner, after Mrs. Acuña almost shoots Bob, so Maria invites Bob to the garden, where they dance (I'm Old Fashioned). Finding that Maria is truly in love with Bob, Mr. Acuña makes a deal with Bob: in exchange for a contract to perform at the club (at some later, unspecified date), Bob will court Maria and repel her with his "obnoxious" personality.
But despite Bob's efforts to disappoint Maria, the two quickly fall in love.

With his plan gone awry, Acuña orders Bob to leave Buenos Aires. At the Acuña's 25th anniversary, Mr. Acuna plans to compose a farewell love note on his behalf while Cecy and Lita try to separate Bob and Maria, but fail. Mr. Acuña's wife sees him writing the note in his office and accuses him of cheating on her with another Maria, her dear friend Maria Castro. While Mr. Acuña tries to defend himself, Bob and Maria come into the office, where Bob has to confess that he hasn't been writing the love-letters to Acuña's daughter, disappointing Maria, who apologizes to Maria Castro.

Impressed by Bob's behavior, Acuña grants him permission to begin dating Maria. After repeated deliveries of flowers fail to impress Maria, Bob asks for Mr. Acuña's help, who tells him about Lochinvar, a fictional knight who was Maria's first love interest. Bob imitates him and tries to dance, which impresses Maria who decides to forgive Bob and stay with him.

Cast

 Fred Astaire as Bob Davis
 Rita Hayworth as Maria Acuña
 Adolphe Menjou as Eduardo Acuña
 Isobel Elsom as Maria Castro
 Leslie Brooks as Cecy Acuña
 Adele Mara as Lita Acuña
 Xavier Cugat as himself
 Gus Schilling as Fernie, Acuña's secretary 
 Barbara Brown as Mrs. Delfina Acuña, Eduardo's wife
 Douglas Leavitt as Juan Castro, Maria's husband

Production 
The film was the second of two films starring the duo of Astaire and Hayworth, following the box-office success of the previous year’s You'll Never Get Rich. The new film avoided the wartime themes of the previous film, while benefiting from lavish production values – a consequence of the box-office success of the earlier film. Kern created a standard with "I'm Old Fashioned". Initially, Kern was unhappy about the selection of Cugat and his orchestra; however, when production was complete, he was so pleased with the band's performance that he presented Cugat with a silver baton. Although Hayworth had a fine voice, Harry Cohn insisted on her singing being dubbed throughout by Nan Wynn.

The film is a reworking of the 1941 Argentine musical Los martes, orquídeas (On Tuesdays, Orchids) directed by Francisco Múgica.
It follows the usual conventions established by Astaire in his earlier musicals, such as an anti-romantic first meeting between the two leads, a virtuoso dance solo for Astaire, a playful dance duet and a romantic dance duet.

Key songs/dance routines
The film's dance director was Val Raset, the only time he collaborated with Astaire, and his choreographic input into the film is unclear. According to Astaire’s biography, he worked out all the numbers with Hayworth while rehearsing above a funeral parlour. Although the setting is a Latin one, Kern felt unable to compose in this style, but Astaire was determined to continue his exploration of Latin dance, which he did with the help of special arrangements by Cugat and Murphy, and the inspiration provided by the enthusiastic and talented Hayworth. This became an important counterbalance to Kern’s tendency to compose sweet, occasionally saccharine, melodies. Hayworth's performance here establishes her claim as one of Astaire’s foremost dance partners.

 "Chiu Chiu": Cugat’s band performs this showpiece samba with music and lyrics by Nicanor Molinare sung and danced by Lina Romay, Miguelito Valdés and chorus in front of Astaire.
 "Dearly Beloved": Kern & Mercer’s ballad became a major hit for Astaire – who sings it here – and it was nominated for an Academy Award for Best Original Song. Shortly after, Hayworth (singing dubbed by Nan Wynn) reprises the song with a brief but erotic dance, alone in her bedroom.
 "Audition Dance": "One of my best solos" was Astaire's verdict on his first solo routine on the theme of Latin dance, celebrated for its comic inventiveness and dexterity. Astaire’s number also inspired Jerome Robbins’ solo Latin dance in the latter’s first ballet Fancy Free, created in 1944.
 "I'm Old Fashioned": A Kern melody, with Mercer’s lyrics mimed by Hayworth, inspires Astaire’s second Latin romantic partnered dance, and one of his best known. This dance was chosen by Jerome Robbins as the centerpiece to his ballet of the same name, created by him for the New York City Ballet in 1983, as a tribute to Astaire.
 "The Shorty George": Required more rehearsal time than all other dances together. A synthesis of American Swing or Jive, and virtuoso tap dancing by Astaire and Hayworth, both in top form and exuding a sense of fun in an arrangement by Lyle "Spud" Murphy. The title refers to a popular dance step of the time, attributed to George "Shorty" Snowden, a champion African-American dancer at Harlem’s Savoy Ballroom and reputed inventor of the Lindy Hop or Jitterbug dance styles. Here, as in the "Pick Yourself Up" and "Bojangles of Harlem" numbers from Swing Time, Kern belied his claim that he couldn't write in the Swing style.
 "Wedding in the Spring": Overly sweet and soppy number performed tongue-in-cheek by Cugat’s band.
 "You Were Never Lovelier": A Kern melody, Mercer lyrics, sung by Astaire to Hayworth, with a celebratory dance reprise at the film’s end, initiated by an armour-suited Astaire falling off a horse, and shedding his knight’s armour, only to reveal himself in white tie and tails. According to Astaire, the original dance number that followed the song was cut from the film after the preview as the studio felt it "held up the story".
 "These Orchids": Cugat's band provides an orchestral serenade in rumba style to Hayworth outside her bedroom window with this Kern melody.

Award nominations
The following received Academy Award nominations:
 Leigh Harline: Music (Scoring of a Musical Picture)
 Jerome Kern (music) and Johnny Mercer (lyrics) for Music (Song), for "Dearly Beloved"
 John P. Livadary: Sound Recording

References

Bibliography
 Fred Astaire: Steps in Time, 1959, multiple reprints.
 John Mueller: Astaire Dancing - The Musical Films of Fred Astaire, Knopf 1985,

External links
 
 
 
 

1942 films
1942 musical comedy films
1942 romantic comedy films
1940s American films
1940s English-language films
1940s romantic musical films
American black-and-white films
American musical comedy films
American remakes of Argentine films
American romantic comedy films
American romantic musical films
Columbia Pictures films
Comedy film remakes
Films directed by William A. Seiter
Films set in Argentina
Films set in Buenos Aires
Films scored by Leigh Harline
Musical film remakes
Romance film remakes